General George B. McClellan  is an equestrian bronze sculpture, by Henry Jackson Ellicott.

History
It is located at Philadelphia City Hall North plaza, at Broad Street & John F. Kennedy Boulevard, Philadelphia.
It was dedicated in October 1894, and relocated in 1936.

See also
 List of public art in Philadelphia

References

Outdoor sculptures in Philadelphia
1894 sculptures
Equestrian statues in Pennsylvania
Bronze sculptures in Pennsylvania
Sculptures of men in Pennsylvania
1894 establishments in Pennsylvania
Equestrian statues in Philadelphia